Tony Kaltak (born 4 March 1996) is a Vanuatuan international footballer who plays as a forward for Solomon Warriors. He made his debut for the national team on March 26, 2016 in their 2–1 win against New Caledonia.

Club

International career

International goals
Scores and results list Vanuatu's goal tally first.

Date of birth
Kaltak's birth date is unsubstantiated. Dates of 4 March 1996, 5 September 1996 and 5 November 1996 have been suggested.

Personal life
Tony's older brother Jean (born 1994), younger brother Kalfter (born 1997) and cousin Brian (born 1993), are also footballers. His father, Ivoky is a former Vanuatu international footballer who also played as a striker.

References

External links
 

Living people
1996 births
Vanuatuan footballers
Association football defenders
Vanuatu international footballers
Erakor Golden Star F.C. players
2016 OFC Nations Cup players
Vanuatu youth international footballers
Vanuatu under-20 international footballers